Jack Lihou (9 September 1930 – 6 January 2021) was an Australian first-class cricketer who played 26 matches for Queensland between 1955 and 1965.

Cricket career
A leg-spin bowler who worked in Brisbane as a plumber, Lihou had a successful season in Brisbane senior cricket in 1953–54, and was added to the state squad for the next season. He made his first-class debut for Queensland in the Sheffield Shield against Victoria in 1955–56, taking the wickets of Neil Harvey and Sam Loxton. He played four matches in that season but took only five wickets at an average of 66.80.

He played one match in 1959–60, and was not selected in Queensland's first two matches in 1960–61. He returned to the side to play the West Indians, and took one wicket, that of Gary Sobers. He remained in the side for the rest of the season and finished with 21 wickets at 37.04, including four wickets in the victory over South Australia in Adelaide and five in the victory over Western Australia in Perth a week later.

Lihou played the first six matches in 1961–62 but took only 11 wickets at 46.81 and lost his spot towards the end of the season. After that he played eight matches in three seasons, in which he took 10 wickets at 78.50.

Other sports
Lihou also played Australian rules football for Sandgate Football Club as a full-back. The Jack Lihou Oval in the Brisbane suburb of Deagon is named after him.

References

External links
 
 Jack Lihou at CricketArchive

1930 births
2021 deaths
Cricketers from Brisbane
Australian cricketers
Queensland cricketers
Sandgate Football Club players